Cymindis moralesi is a species of ground beetle in the subfamily Harpalinae. It was described by Mateu in 1979.

References

moralesi
Beetles described in 1979